This is a list of speakers of the Massachusetts House of Representatives. The Speaker of the House presides over the House of Representatives. The Speaker is elected by the majority party caucus followed by confirmation of the full House through the passage of a House Resolution. As well as presiding over the body, the Speaker is also the chief leader, and controls the flow of legislation. Other House leaders, such as the majority and minority leaders, are elected by their respective party caucuses relative to their party's strength in the House. The current house speaker is Ronald Mariano.

House of Deputies of the Massachusetts Bay Colony

Inter-Charter Period

Second Charter of the Province of Massachusetts Bay

Massachusetts Provincial Congress of Deputies

House of Representatives under the Massachusetts Constitution

See also
 List of presidents of the Massachusetts Senate
 List of Massachusetts General Courts
 List of former districts of the Massachusetts House of Representatives

Notes
1. Prior to 1857, representatives were selected by a majority of votes at a town meeting. Since 1857, representatives have been elected by district.

Sources

References

List of Speakers
Speakers of the Massachusetts House of Representatives
List
Massac
Political history of Massachusetts